Manon Valentino (born 25 August 1990) is a French cyclist. She represented her country at the 2016 and 2020 Summer Olympics.

References

External links 

 
 
 
 

1990 births
Living people
BMX riders
French female cyclists
Olympic cyclists of France
Cyclists at the 2016 Summer Olympics
Cyclists at the 2020 Summer Olympics
Sportspeople from Vaucluse
Cyclists from Provence-Alpes-Côte d'Azur